Iraty Sport Club, or simply Iraty, is a Brazilian football team from Irati in Paraná, founded on April 21, 1914.

Their home stadium is the Coronel Emílio Gomes stadium, capacity 8,000.

History

The club was founded at Irati city, in 1914. The founders were a group of sportsmen led by Antônio Xavier da Silveira. Iraty Sport Club is one of the oldest clubs of Paraná and the club's first match was in 1914, defeating Imbituvense by 3-0.

On May 1, 2002, the club won its first state championship, competing the Copa do Brasil of the following year. In that year, the club also won the Campeonato Paranaense  de Juniores (Paraná Youth Championship).

Titles
 Campeonato Paranaense: 1
2002
 Campeonato Paranaense Second Division: 1
1993
 Campeonato Paranaense de Juniores: 1
2002

Squads 2011

Out to loan

Coach
  Ivica Kulasevic (2002)

External links
 Official Website

 
Association football clubs established in 1914
Iraty
1914 establishments in Brazil
Irati, Paraná